Magill forceps are angled forceps used to guide a tracheal tube into the larynx or a nasogastric tube into the esophagus under direct vision. They are also used to remove foreign bodies. These forceps are named after the Irish-born anaesthetist Ivan Magill.

References 

Medical clamps